Tibor Resznecki is a former U.S. soccer defender who earned three caps with the U.S. national team in 1965.

Club career
Resznecki career is difficult to follow from the available sources.  In 1960, he played for the New York Hungarians of the German American Soccer League.  The team won the league title that year.  In 1965, he played a single season with the New Yorkers of the International Soccer League.  Then, in 1967, he was with the New York Generals of the National Professional Soccer League.  Today he is a member of the Los Angeles Soccer Club.

National team
Resznecki’s three games with the national team came in three World Cup qualifiers played in March 1965.  The first two were losses to Mexico on March 7 and March 12.  On March 17, Resznecki replaced Bayardo Abaunza in a 1-0 win over Honduras.

References

United States men's international soccer players
German-American Soccer League players
International Soccer League players
Los Angeles Soccer Club players
National Professional Soccer League (1967) players
Living people
American soccer players
Association football defenders
Year of birth missing (living people)